Nattaphon Nacheukvittayakom is a Thai Muay Thai fighter.

Titles and accomplishments

 2014 Lumpinee Stadium 122 lbs Champion

Fight record

|-  style="background:#cfc;"
| 2018-08-10 || Win ||align=left| Kongfak Sitphuphadom  ||  || Thailand || Decision || 5 || 3:00
|-  style="background:#fbb;"
| 2018-06-15 || Loss ||align=left| Tomas Sor.Chaijaroen  ||  || Thailand || Decision || 5 || 3:00
|-  style="background:#fbb;"
| 2018-01-26 || Loss ||align=left| Saksit Tor.PaoPiamSapradriew  || Rangsit Stadium || Rangsit, Thailand || Decision || 5 || 3:00
|-  style="background:#cfc;"
| 2017-12-15 || Win ||align=left| Manasak Pinsinchai  || Rangsit Stadium || Rangsit, Thailand || Decision || 5 || 3:00
|-  style="background:#fbb;"
| 2017-09-08 || Loss ||align=left| Manasak Pinsinchai  || Rangsit Stadium || Rangsit, Thailand || Decision || 5 || 3:00
|-  style="background:#cfc;"
| 2017-08-09 || Win ||align=left| Praramkao 13 Leanresort || Sofia Hotel || Prachinburi Province, Thailand || Decision || 5 || 3:00
|-  style="background:#cfc;"
| 2017-06-16 || Win ||align=left| Thepwalit RawaiMuaythai  || Rangsit Stadium || Rangsit, Thailand || Decision || 5 || 3:00
|-  style="background:#fbb;"
| 2017-03-24 || Loss ||align=left| Yod ET TEDED99   || Rangsit Stadium || Rangsit, Thailand || Decision ||5 || 3:00
|-  style="background:#cfc;"
| 2017-02-10|| Win ||align=left| Mahakan Sitpupandom || Rangsit Stadium || Rangsit, Thailand || Decision ||5 || 3:00
|-  style="background:#cfc;"
| 2016-12-17|| Win ||align=left| Kwanphet Sor.Suwanpakdee ||  || Thailand || Decision ||5 || 3:00
|-  style="background:#fbb;"
| 2016-11-18 || Loss ||align=left| Yod ET TEDED99   || Rangsit Stadium || Rangsit, Thailand || TKO || 4 ||
|-  style="background:#cfc;"
| 2016-09-23 || Win ||align=left| Yodsenchai Sor.Sopit   || Rangsit Stadium || Rangsit, Thailand || Decision || 5 || 3:00
|-  style="background:#cfc;"
| 2016-08-26 || Win ||align=left| Thepwalit RawaiMuaythai  || Rangsit Stadium || Rangsit, Thailand || Decision || 5 || 3:00
|-  style="background:#fbb;"
| 2016-06-19 || Loss ||align=left| Saksit Tor.PaoPiamSapradriew  || Rangsit Stadium || Rangsit, Thailand || Decision || 5 || 3:00
|-  style="background:#cfc;"
| 2016-04-16 || Win ||align=left| Rungkit Wor.Sanprapai  || Rangsit Stadium || Rangsit, Thailand || Decision || 5 || 3:00
|-  style="background:#cfc;"
| 2016-03-20|| Win ||align=left| Thepnimit Sitmonchai || Rajadamnern Stadium || Bangkok, Thailand || Decision ||5 || 3:00
|-  style="background:#fbb;"
| 2016-01-21|| Loss ||align=left| Khundiew Payabkhamphan || Rajadamnern Stadium || Bangkok, Thailand || Decision ||5 || 3:00
|-  style="background:#cfc;"
| 2015-12-27|| Win ||align=left| Ikki  || BRAVE CORE || Hyōgo Prefecture, Japan || Decision ||5 || 3:00
|-
! style=background:white colspan=9 |
|-  style="background:#fbb;"
| 2015-10-06|| Loss ||align=left| Morakot Phetsimuen || Lumpinee Stadium || Bangkok, Thailand || Decision ||5 || 3:00
|-  style="background:#cfc;"
| 2015-09-09|| Win ||align=left| Fasitong Sor.Jor.Piek-Uthai || Rajadamnern Stadium || Bangkok, Thailand || Decision ||5 || 3:00
|-  style="background:#cfc;"
| 2015-08-12|| Win ||align=left| Kwanphet Sor.Suwanpakdee || Rajadamnern Stadium || Bangkok, Thailand || Decision ||5 || 3:00
|-  style="background:#cfc;"
| 2015-07-19|| Win ||align=left| Ikki  || BRAVE CORE || Hyōgo Prefecture, Japan || Decision ||5 || 3:00
|-
! style=background:white colspan=9 |
|-  style="background:#cfc;"
| 2015-06-03|| Win ||align=left| Thelek Wor.Sangprapai || Rajadamnern Stadium || Bangkok, Thailand || Decision ||5 || 3:00
|-  style="background:#cfc;"
| 2015-04-19|| Win ||align=left| Sota Ichinohe || WPMF JAPAN×REBELS.35 || Tokyo, Japan || Decision (Unanimous) || 5 || 3:00
|- 
! style=background:white colspan=9 |
|-  style="background:#fbb;"
| 2015-01-22|| Loss ||align=left| Kwanphet Sor.Suwanpakdee || Rajadamnern Stadium || Bangkok, Thailand || Decision ||5 || 3:00
|-  style="background:#cfc;"
| 2014-12-28|| Win ||align=left| Ikki  || BRAVE CORE || Hyōgo Prefecture, Japan || Decision (Unanimous) ||5 || 3:00
|-
! style=background:white colspan=9 |
|-  style="background:#cfc;"
| 2014-11-13|| Win ||align=left| Kongpop Thor.Pran49 || Rajadamnern Stadium || Bangkok, Thailand || Decision ||5 || 3:00
|-  style="background:#cfc;"
| 2014-10-12|| Win ||align=left| Arashi Fujihara || Shuken 22 || Tokyo, Japan || Decision (Unanimous)|| 5 || 3:00
|-
! style=background:white colspan=9 |
|-  style="background:#cfc;"
| 2014-05-11|| Win ||align=left| Ikki  || BRAVE CORE || Hyōgo Prefecture, Japan || Decision (Unanimous) ||5 || 3:00
|-
! style=background:white colspan=9 |
|-  style="background:#fbb;"
| 2013-12-22|| Loss ||align=left| Ikki  || BRAVE CORE || Hyōgo Prefecture, Japan || Decision (Unanimous) ||5 || 3:00
|-  style="background:#cfc;"
| 2013-09-20|| Win ||align=left| Thepnimit Sitmonchai || Lumpinee Stadium || Bangkok, Thailand || Decision ||5 || 3:00
|-  style="background:#fbb;"
| 2013-04-13|| Loss ||align=left| Jaosurenoi Pehtsuphaphan || Omnoi Stadium || Thailand || Decision ||5 || 3:00
|-  style="background:#fbb;"
| 2010-11-14|| Loss||align=left| Norasing Lukbanyai ||  || Phimai District, Thailand || KO || 1 || 
|-
| colspan=9| Legend:

References

Nattaphon Nacheukvittayakom
Living people
Year of birth missing (living people)